Płowce  is a village in the administrative district of Gmina Radziejów, within Radziejów County, Kuyavian-Pomeranian Voivodeship, in north-central Poland. The village has a population of 570.

It is best known for the Battle of Płowce, which took place on 27 September 1331 between the kingdom of Poland (led by King Władysław I Łokietek) and the Teutonic Knights. Although there was no outright winner, it stopped the expansion of the Teutonic Order in the Kuyavia region. The battlefield is marked by a cross and monument.

References

Villages in Radziejów County